Zhou Lingmei (born 28 March 1968) is a Chinese former cyclist. She competed in the women's individual pursuit at the 1992 Summer Olympics.

References

External links
 

1968 births
Living people
Chinese female cyclists
Olympic cyclists of China
Cyclists at the 1992 Summer Olympics
Asian Games medalists in cycling
Cyclists at the 1990 Asian Games
Medalists at the 1990 Asian Games
Asian Games gold medalists for China
Asian Games bronze medalists for China
20th-century Chinese women